Fairview Township is one of 26 townships in Fulton County, in the U.S. state of Illinois.  As of the 2010 census, its population was 698 and it contained 303 housing units.

Geography

Cities, towns, villages
 Fairview
 Oak Mound (no longer exists)
 Parrville

Cemeteries
The township contains these five cemeteries: Coal Creek, Fairview, Lyons, Markley and Shumaker.

Major highways
  Illinois Route 97
  Illinois Route 116

Demographics

School districts
 Farmington Central Community Unit School District 265
 Spoon River Valley Community Unit School District 4

Political districts
 Illinois' 17th congressional district
 State House District 91
 State Senate District 46

References
 
 United States Census Bureau 2007 TIGER/Line Shapefiles
 United States National Atlas

External links
 City-Data.com
 Illinois State Archives

Townships in Fulton County, Illinois
Townships in Illinois